Violet Hill is an unincorporated area in York County, Pennsylvania, United States. This community, which is located in Spring Garden Township, is a suburb of the city of York.

References

Unincorporated communities in York County, Pennsylvania
Unincorporated communities in Pennsylvania